Ophonus similis is a species of ground beetle in the subfamily Harpalinae, genus Ophonus, and subgenus Ophonus (Hesperophonus).

References

similis
Beetles described in 1829